This is a list of elections in the U.S. state of Nevada. Nevada is a swing state in state and federal elections, with margins that typically are under five percent. Unique to the state is the "None of These Candidates" voting option for all statewide and presidential and vice-presidential election ballots. This option is listed along with the names of individuals running for the position and is often described as "none of the above". The option first appeared on the Nevada ballot in 1975.

If the "None of These Candidates" option receives the most votes in an election, then the actual candidate who receives the most votes still wins the election. This has most notably happened on two occasions: in the 1976 Republican primary for Nevada's At-large congressional district, None of These Candidates received 16,097 votes, while Walden Earhart won 9,831 votes, followed by Dart Anthony with 8,097 votes. Even though he received fewer votes than "None of These Candidates", Earhart received the Republican nomination. He went on to lose to incumbent Democratic Congressman Jim Santini in the general election. In the 2014 Democratic gubernatorial primary, "None of These Candidates" won 30% of the popular vote, a plurality. Robert Goodman, the runner-up with 25% of the vote, was the Democratic nominee by state law.

In a 2020 study, Nevada was ranked as the 23rd hardest state for citizens to vote in.

Presidential

1864 United States presidential election in Nevada
1868 United States presidential election in Nevada
1872 United States presidential election in Nevada
1876 United States presidential election in Nevada
1880 United States presidential election in Nevada
1884 United States presidential election in Nevada
1888 United States presidential election in Nevada
1892 United States presidential election in Nevada
1896 United States presidential election in Nevada
1900 United States presidential election in Nevada
1904 United States presidential election in Nevada
1908 United States presidential election in Nevada
1912 United States presidential election in Nevada
1916 United States presidential election in Nevada
1920 United States presidential election in Nevada
1924 United States presidential election in Nevada
1928 United States presidential election in Nevada
1932 United States presidential election in Nevada
1936 United States presidential election in Nevada
1940 United States presidential election in Nevada
1944 United States presidential election in Nevada
1948 United States presidential election in Nevada
1952 United States presidential election in Nevada
1956 United States presidential election in Nevada
1960 United States presidential election in Nevada
1964 United States presidential election in Nevada
1968 United States presidential election in Nevada
1972 United States presidential election in Nevada
1976 United States presidential election in Nevada
1980 United States presidential election in Nevada
1984 United States presidential election in Nevada
1988 United States presidential election in Nevada
1992 United States presidential election in Nevada
1996 United States presidential election in Nevada
2000 United States presidential election in Nevada
2004 United States presidential election in Nevada
2008 United States presidential election in Nevada
2012 United States presidential election in Nevada
2016 United States presidential election in Nevada
2020 United States presidential election in Nevada
2024 United States presidential election in Nevada

National legislative

House of Representatives
2006 United States House of Representatives elections in Nevada
2006 Nevada's 2nd congressional district election
2008 United States House of Representatives elections in Nevada
2010 United States House of Representatives elections in Nevada
2011 Nevada's 2nd congressional district special election
2012 United States House of Representatives elections in Nevada
2014 United States House of Representatives elections in Nevada
2016 United States House of Representatives elections in Nevada
2018 United States House of Representatives elections in Nevada
2020 United States House of Representatives elections in Nevada
2022 United States House of Representatives elections in Nevada
2024 United States House of Representatives elections in Nevada
2026 United States House of Representatives elections in Nevada

Senate
1958 United States Senate election in Nevada
1964 United States Senate election in Nevada
1970 United States Senate election in Nevada
1974 United States Senate election in Nevada
1976 United States Senate election in Nevada
1980 United States Senate election in Nevada
1982 United States Senate election in Nevada
1986 United States Senate election in Nevada
1988 United States Senate election in Nevada
1992 United States Senate election in Nevada
1994 United States Senate election in Nevada
1998 United States Senate election in Nevada
2000 United States Senate election in Nevada
2004 United States Senate election in Nevada
2006 United States Senate election in Nevada
2010 United States Senate election in Nevada
2012 United States Senate election in Nevada
2016 United States Senate election in Nevada
2018 United States Senate election in Nevada
2022 United States Senate election in Nevada
2024 United States Senate election in Nevada

State executive

General
2010 Nevada elections
2012 Nevada elections
2014 Nevada elections
2016 Nevada elections
2018 Nevada elections
2020 Nevada elections
2022 Nevada elections
2024 Nevada elections
2026 Nevada elections

Gubernatorial
1906 Nevada gubernatorial election
1910 Nevada gubernatorial election
1914 Nevada gubernatorial election
1918 Nevada gubernatorial election
1922 Nevada gubernatorial election
1926 Nevada gubernatorial election
1930 Nevada gubernatorial election
1934 Nevada gubernatorial election
1938 Nevada gubernatorial election
1942 Nevada gubernatorial election
1946 Nevada gubernatorial election
1950 Nevada gubernatorial election
1954 Nevada gubernatorial election
1958 Nevada gubernatorial election
1962 Nevada gubernatorial election
1966 Nevada gubernatorial election
1970 Nevada gubernatorial election
1974 Nevada gubernatorial election
1978 Nevada gubernatorial election
1982 Nevada gubernatorial election
1986 Nevada gubernatorial election
1990 Nevada gubernatorial election
1994 Nevada gubernatorial election
1998 Nevada gubernatorial election
2002 Nevada gubernatorial election
2006 Nevada gubernatorial election
2010 Nevada gubernatorial election
2014 Nevada gubernatorial election
2018 Nevada gubernatorial election
2022 Nevada gubernatorial election
2026 Nevada gubernatorial election

Local
2011 Las Vegas mayoral election
2013 North Las Vegas mayoral election
2015 Las Vegas mayoral election
2017 Henderson mayoral election
2017 North Las Vegas mayoral election
2018 Reno mayoral election
2019 Las Vegas mayoral election
2022 Henderson mayoral election
2022 North Las Vegas mayoral election
2022 Reno mayoral election
2024 Las Vegas mayoral election
2026 Henderson mayoral election
2026 North Las Vegas mayoral election
2026 Reno mayoral election

Other
2002 Nevada Question 2
2016 initiative to legalize cannabis

See also
Political party strength in Nevada
Politics in Nevada
Nevada Legislature
None of These Candidates (voting option)
List of United States senators from Nevada
List of United States representatives from Nevada
 2020 Nevada elections
Women's suffrage in Nevada

References

External links

 
 
  (State affiliate of the U.S. League of Women Voters)
 . ("Deadlines, dates, requirements, registration options and information on how to vote in your state")
 

 
Government of Nevada
Political events in Nevada